The first-ever final four in the history of EuroCup Basketball, officially called the EuroCup Finals, was held at Fernando Buesa Arena, in Vitoria-Gasteiz, Spain. Euroleague Basketball Company did not initially commit to a third-place game, but ultimately decided to schedule that match up.

Bracket

Semifinals

Third-place playoff

Final

External links
Results

2009–10 Eurocup Basketball
2010
2010 in Spanish sport
International basketball competitions hosted by Spain